Austrocochlea constricta, common names the  southern periwinkle, common periwinkle, or ribbon monodonta, is a species of sea snail, a marine gastropod mollusk in the family Trochidae, the top snails.

Description
The height of the shell varies between 15 mm and 32 mm, its diameter between 22 mm and 28 mm. The thick, solid shell is imperforate. Its color is a lusterless ashen or whitish, obscurely marked with black zigzag lines and stripes, or with spiral articulated zones or with spiral stripes of black. Sometimes it is nearly unicolored. The spire is conical with an acute apex. The about five whorls are convex. The first one is eroded, the penultimate is very strongly spirally tricostate. The body whorl has about seven strong carinae. The aperture is oblique. The outer and basal lips are either thick and multilirate within, or rather thin and slightly furrowed at the places of the principal carinae. The short columella is oblique, subdentate at its base and at the insertion spreading in a strong callus upon the parietal wall.

Distribution
This marine species is endemic to Australia and occurs off New South Wales, South Australia, Tasmania, Victoria and Western Australia

References

 Dillwyn, L.W. 1817. A descriptive catalogue of Recent shells, arranged according to the Linnaean method; with particular attention to the synonymy. London : John and Arthur Arch 2 volumes 1092 + 29 pp.
 Menke, K.T. 1829. Verzeichniss der ansehnlischen Conchylien-Sammlung der Freiherrn von der Malsburg. Pyrmonti : Publisher not known pp. i-vi, 1-123
 Quoy, J.R. & Gaimard, J.P. 1834. Voyage de Découvertes de l'Astrolabe exécuté par Ordre du Roi, Pendant les Années 1826-1829. Paris : J. Tastu Zoologie Vol. 3 366 pp. 
 Adams, A. 1853. Contributions towards a monograph of the Trochidae, a family of gastropodous Mollusca. Proceedings of the Zoological Society of London 1851(19): 150-192 
 Chenu, J.C. 1859. Manual de Conchyliologie et de Paléontologie Conchyliologique. Paris : V. Masson Vol. 1 i-vii, 508 pp
 Tenison-Woods, J.E. 1877. Census; with brief descriptions of the marine shells of Tasmania and the adjacent islands. Papers and Proceedings of the Royal Society of Tasmania 1877: 3-34 
 Fischer, P. 1878. Genres Calcar, Trochus, Xenophora, Tectarius et Risella. pp. 241-336 in Keiner, L.C. (ed.). Spécies general et iconographie des coquilles vivantes. Paris : J.B. Baillière Vol. 11.
 Pritchard, G.B. & Gatliff, J.H. 1902. Catalogue of the marine shells of Victoria. Part V. Proceedings of the Royal Society of Victoria 14(2): 85-138 
 Hedley, C. 1917. Studies on Australian Mollusca. Part XIII. Proceedings of the Linnean Society of New South Wales 41: 680-719
 Cotton, B.C. & Godfrey, F.K. 1934. South Australian Shells. Part 13. South Australian Naturalist 1 16: 1-6
 Cotton, B.C. 1959. South Australian Mollusca. Archaeogastropoda. Handbook of the Flora and Fauna of South Australia. Adelaide : South Australian Government Printer 449 pp.
 Macpherson, J.H. 1962. Trochus obtusa confusion. Memoirs of the National Museum of Victoria 25: 173-176 
 Iredale, T. & McMichael, D.F. 1962. A reference list of the marine Mollusca of New South Wales. Memoirs of the Australian Museum 11: 1-109 
 Ludbrook, N.H. 1978. Quaternary molluscs of the western part of the Eucla Basin. Bulletin of the Geological Survey of Western Australia 125: 1-286
 Wilson, B. 1993. Australian Marine Shells. Prosobranch Gastropods. Kallaroo, Western Australia : Odyssey Publishing Vol. 1 408 pp

External links
 To Antarctic Invertebrates
 To Barcode of Life (1 barcode)
 To Biodiversity Heritage Library (11 publications)
 To Encyclopedia of Life
 To GenBank (26 nucleotides; 12 proteins)
 To USNM Invertebrate Zoology Mollusca Collection
 To World Register of Marine Species
 

constricta
Gastropods of Australia
Gastropods described in 1822